Aurelio Lomi (29 February 1556 – 1622) was an Italian painter of the late-Renaissance and early-Baroque periods, active mainly in his native town of Pisa, Tuscany.


Biography
He may have initially been trained by his father, Giovanni Battista Lomi, but soon he worked in Florence (1580-1590) under the painters Alessandro Allori, then Lodovico Cardi (known as Cigoli). He was the nephew of the painter Baccio Lomi. He painted in Pisa, Florence, Rome, and Genoa. He painted a St. Jerome (1595) for the Duomo of Pisa. In addition he painted frescoes of San Frediano and Santo Stefano. He painted an altarpiece for Santa Apollonia. He painted a St Anthony of Padua for the church of San Francesco di Casteletto in Genoa, and a Resurrection of Christ and Last Judgement for Santa Maria Assunta in Carignano. In Rome, he painted frescoes in the Pinelli chapel of Chiesa Nuova, including Scenes from the life of the Virgin and Birth of Jesus on the arches, and the Dormition, Coronation, and Funeral of the Madonna on the vault. The walls are frescoed with Rebecca and Eleazar and Yael and Sisera.

A pupil and half-brother of Lomi was Orazio Gentileschi (born 1562). Other pupils include Orazio Riminaldi, Simone Balli, Domenico Fiasella, Pietro Gnocchi (painter), and Augustin Montanari.

Works
 Saint Anthony of Padua, Church of San Francesco, Castelletto, Genoa
 Resurrection and Last Judgement, Santa Maria in Carignano, Genoa
 Birth of the Virgin, church of San Siro (Genoa).
 Deposition from the Cross

Works in Pisa
 Madonna and Angels, Palazzo Gambacorti.
 Saint Jerome (1595), Pisa Cathedral.
 Virtue, Church of San Michele in Borgo.
 Adoration by the Magi, Church of San Frediano.
 Glory of St. Thomas (1563) Church of Santa Caterina d'Alessandria.
 Madonna and Child behind Saint Joseph and Stephen (1593), Church of Santo Stefano dei Cavalieri.
 Madonna with saints Ranieri, Torpè, and Leonardo. San Ranierino.

References

External links

Orazio and Artemisia Gentileschi, a fully digitized exhibition catalog from The Metropolitan Museum of Art Libraries, which contains material on Aurelio Lomi (see index)

1556 births
1622 deaths
People from Pisa
16th-century Italian painters
Italian male painters
17th-century Italian painters
Painters from Tuscany
Italian Baroque painters
Fresco painters